The Cabinet of Htin Kyaw, co-headed by President Htin Kyaw and State Counsellor Aung San Suu Kyi, is the former government of Myanmar which took office from 30 March 2016 to 30 March 2018 after the 2015 general election. This election saw the opposition National League for Democracy (NLD) win a majority in both chambers of parliament.

Overview
NLD chairperson Aung San Suu Kyi had vowed to rule 'above' the President. The constitution barred her from the presidency, because her husband Michael Aris and her two children hold British nationality.

Under the constitution, three ministers - of Border Affairs, Defence and Home Affairs - are appointed directly by the National Defence and Security Council. The remaining 15 ministers were appointed by Htin Kyaw and included a majority from the NLD, but also two members of the former ruling party, the Union Solidarity and Development Party (USDP) and a number of independents.

On 24 November 2017,two new ministries, Ministry of International Cooperation and Ministry of the Office of the Union Government  were created.

State Counsellor 
The State Counsellor post was created on 6 April 2016 to allow for a greater role for Aung San Suu Kyi within the Government of Myanmar.

The bill to create the post was passed by the upper house of the Assembly of the Union on 1 April 2016 and by the lower house on 5 April 2016, and signed by President Htin Kyaw on 6 April 2016. The roles of the State Counsellor are similar to the previous Prime Minister of Myanmar.

Cabinet Formation
The cabinet members are from NLD, USDP, Military and MNP. The chairperson of NLD hold the four major ministers in the cabinet. On 25 May 2016, Htin Kyaw announced the reconstitution of his union government by the announcement No 9/2016. Aung San Suu Kyi handed over two ministries to the ministers Pe Zin Tun and Myo Thein Gyi. A new ministry was created to serve the works of the State Counsellor.

On 18 November 2016, Deputy Minister for Agriculture, Livestock and Irrigation, Tun Win was dismissed. On 2 August 2017, Minister for Electricity and Energy, Pe Zin Tun resigned.

On 27 November 2017, the Union Assembly approved the creation of two new ministries - the Ministry of the Office of the Union Government, and the Ministry of International Cooperation, bringing the total number of ministries to 24.

Heads and Ministers

References

2016 establishments in Myanmar
Cabinets established in 2016
Cabinet of Myanmar